Mirko Pavinato (20 June 1934 – 7 March 2021) was an Italian football player and manager, who played as a defender.

Club career
Pavinato grew up as a football player in the L.R. Vicenza, where with the "Primavera" team led by manager Umberto Menti he won the Torneo di Viareggio twice in a row, in 1954 and 1955.

He made his debut in the first team in the 1953–54 Serie B season, the first in which Vicenza played under the name of the sponsor Lanerossi. In that season he played only one game, the last of the league, on 30 May 1954. Becoming a starter the following year, he was among the protagonists of promotion to Serie A.

In 1956 he was sold to Bologna, of which he became captain starting from the 1959–1960 season, winning the Scudetto in 1964 after a play-off against Inter.

In ten seasons at Bologna, from 1956 to 1966, he made 264 league appearances. In addition to the Scudetto, he collected two fourths and two fifths, in addition to the second of his last season, in which he took the field only three times.

After moving to Mantova, he played in Serie A for another two years, without being able to do anything in the year of relegation to Serie B in 1968. He finished his career in Serie A at 34, after thirteen seasons in which he played 349 games, in addition to the play-off for the 1964 title.

International career
He obtained four international caps for his national B team.

Managerial career
Pavinato served as manager of San Marino between 1971 and 1972.

Personal life and death
His daughter married Francesco Gazzaneo, also a footballer.

Pavinato died in March 2021 at the age of 86, following kidney problems aggravated by contracting COVID-19 during the COVID-19 pandemic in Italy.

Honours

Club
Vicenza
Serie B: 1954–55

Bologna
Serie A: 1963–64
Mitropa Cup: 1961

References

1934 births
2021 deaths
Sportspeople from Vicenza
Italian footballers
Association football defenders
Italy B international footballers
Italian football managers
L.R. Vicenza players
Bologna F.C. 1909 players
Mantova 1911 players
A.S.D. Victor San Marino managers
Deaths from the COVID-19 pandemic in Emilia-Romagna
Footballers from Veneto